Hoseynabad (also Romanized as Ḩoseynābād; also known as Husainābād) is a village in Gavdul-e Markazi Rural District, in the Central District of Malekan County, East Azerbaijan Province, Iran. At the 2006 census, its population was 1,918, in 447 families.

References 

Populated places in Malekan County